Christian Hector McFarlane (born 25 January 2007) is an English professional footballer who plays as a left-back for the American club New York City FC.

Club career
A youth product of the JIGS Soccer Academy, McFarlane moved to the New York City FC youth academy in 2018 and worked his way up their youth categories. On 16 September 2021 at the age of 14 years and 7 months he signed his first professional contract with New York City FC; in doing so he was the third youngest player to sign a Major League Soccer contract. He was promoted to New York City FC II and made his senior and professional debut with them as a half-time substitute in a 2–1 win over Inter Miami CF II on 29 May 2022.

International career 
McFarlane was born in England and moved to the United States at the age of 3. He is of Jamaican descent. He was called up to a training camp for the United States U16s in August 2022. He represented the England U16 in a set of friendlies in November 2022. He was called up to a training camp with the United States U17s in January 2023 in preparation for the 2023 CONCACAF U-17 Championship.

References

External links
 
 NYFC Profile

2007 births
Living people
Sportspeople from Basildon
English footballers
England youth international footballers
American soccer players
English sportspeople of Jamaican descent
American sportspeople of Jamaican descent
English emigrants to the United States
Association football fullbacks
New York City FC players
New York City FC II players
MLS Next Pro players
Homegrown Players (MLS)